The Many Faces of Art Farmer is an album by Art Farmer recorded in 1964 and originally released on the Scepter label.

Reception
The Allmusic review awarded the album two stars.

Track listing
 "Happy Feet" (Tom McIntosh) - 4:39   
 "Hyacinth" (Dennis Sandole) - 5:00   
 "Ally" (McIntosh) - 6:46   
 "Minuet in G" (McIntosh) - 5:00   
 "All About Art" (Sergio Mihanovich) - 4:41   
 "People" (Jule Styne, Bob Merrill) - 5:15   
 "Saucer Eyes" (Randy Weston) - 4:48

Personnel
Art Farmer - flugelhorn
Charles McPherson - alto saxophone
Tommy Flanagan - piano
Ron Carter (tracks 2, 4 & 7), Steve Swallow (tracks 1, 3, 5 & 6) - bass
Bobby Thomas - drums

References 

Scepter Records albums
Art Farmer albums
1964 albums